Rick Lopes is an American politician who currently represents the 6th District in the Connecticut State Senate since 2021. Lopes formerly represented the 24th District of the Connecticut House of Representatives Member-elect of the Connecticut State Senate. Lopes ran for the 6th District seat in the Connecticut State Senate during the 2020 election. Lopes won the election against Republican Incumbent Gennaro Bizzarro. Lopes began his two-year term in the Connecticut State Senate on January 3, 2021 and will seek re-election in 2022.

Early career
Rick Lopes has owned and managed a property management business serving West Hartford, New Britain, and Hartford, Connecticut. Rick Lopes graduated from University of Connecticut with a Bachelor's degree in Literature, as well as a second Bachelor's degree in Sociology. In 2003 he earned a Master's degree in Social Work (MSW) from the University of Connecticut.

Political career
Lopes won a special election in 2012 against Republican candidate Peter Steele. Steele and Lopes would go head to head in the 2012 General election as well. With Lopes being victorious. Lopes would win re-election in the 2014 election as well. Defeating Republican Gennaro Bizzarro. Lopes would win the 2016 and 2018 elections. Defeating Republicans James Sanders and Sharan Beloin-Saavedra respectively. In 2019, Rick Lopes ran against Republican State Senator Gennaro Bizzarro in a special election after Senator Terry Gerratana resigned for a position in Governor Lamont's administration where Lopes lost. However, Lopes would ultimately win the seat in a 2020 general election and help add to the Democratic majority in the Connecticut State Senate.

Electoral history

2020 
Rick Lopes defeated Republican Incumbent Gennaro Bizzarro. Bizzarro has represented the 6th District since 2019.

References

Democratic Party members of the Connecticut House of Representatives
Democratic Party Connecticut state senators
Living people
Year of birth missing (living people)
Politicians from New Britain, Connecticut
21st-century American politicians